Tommy Traynor may refer to:
 Tommy Traynor (Irish footballer) (1933–2006)
 Tommy Traynor (Scottish footballer) (1943–1993)

See also
 Thomas Traynor, member of the Irish Republican Army